There are places of worship considered important in the Kannur district. Kannur District (Malayalam: കണ്ണൂര്‍ ജില്ല) is one of the 14 districts in the state of Kerala, India. The town of Kannur is the district headquarters, and gives the district its name.

Palakulangara Sree Dharma Sastha Temple

Kottiyoor Vadakkeshwaram Temple

Kottiyoor Temple located at Kottiyoor, is one of the a famous Lord Shiva temple of North Malabar. This temple is located approximately 50 km From Kottayam Malabar.  This Shiva Temple also known as the Kasi of South (Dakshina Kaasi). Authentic name of this temple is Thruchherumana Kshetram, the temple is prominently known as Ikkare Kottiyoor.  Kottiyoor temple is located near Kelakam.The temple is located in the Kottiyoor Wild life Sanctuary(23rd WLS of Kerala). The main attraction is the yearly pilgrimage lasting 27 days called Kottiyoor Vysakha Mahotsavam, commemorating the Daksha Yaga, but during the time of pilgrimage the Thruchherumana Kshetram ('Ikkare Kottiyoor Temple') will be closed. The shrine having the Swayambhu linga on the other bank of the Vavali river is only opened during the time of pilgrimage. The pilgrimage is attended by thousands of devotees.

Thalassery is the nearest rail head, Kannur, Mahe and Vatakara railway stations can also be opted. Kozhikode (Calicut) Airport is the nearest airport.

Muthappan Temple Parassinikkadavu

Sree Muthappan is the most popular God in the North Malabar. Muthappan is (also a theyyam) performed in the famous Muthappan temple in Parassinikkadavu 16 km north of Kannur town.

Parassinikkadavu Sree Muthappan Temple is situated 18 km away from Kannur on the banks of Valapattanam river. The temple is dedicated to Lord Muthappan, believed to be the incarnation of Lord Shiva. This is the only Temple in Southern India where offering to the God is Fish.  Also fish Prasadam is given to devotees. All devotees who eat non-vegetarian food must visit this Temple for blessings. This is also the only temple in Kerala where the Folk art form of North Malabar's 'Theyyam' is presented daily. Toddy and dried fish are the main offerings in this temple, besides boiled grams and fresh tea. Meals as lunch and dinner are provided to the devotees daily. Facility for boating is also available here. Vismaya Water Theme Park and Parassinikkadavu Snake Park is situated near the temple.

Kannur Railway Muthappan Temple

Sree Muthappan is the most popular God in the North Malabar. Sree Muthappan is a Hindu deity worshipped commonly in Kannur district of north Kerala state, South India. Muthappan and Thiruvappan, are considered to be a manifestation of Shiva and Vishnu, and hence Muthappan.

Kannur Railway Muthappan Temple is situated 1 km away from Thavakkara Bus Terminal Complex. The main pooja and vazhipadu at Railway Muthappan Temple Kannur are Thiruvappana, karinkalasam, painkutti, vilakumala, chorunnu, painkutti vellattam.

Official Website 
 Kannur Railway Muthappan Temple Official website

Oliyankara Juma Masjid, Cherukunnu

Oliyankara Juma Masjid located at Cherukunnu, is a famous Mosque of North Malabar. This mosque is very ancient and historical place for Malabar Muslim Society.  It is believed that the priests in ancient days gave importance to the Hindu Gods at this Mosque.  The Mosque is at Pallichal near Cherukunnu Town, around 14 km from Kannur, 16 km from Taliparamba and 18 km from Payyannur.

Kannapuram is the nearest rail head (Nearest Major Railway Station is Kannur). Kozhikode (Calicut) Airport is the nearest airport.  Kannur Airport is under construction near Mattannur.

Thavam Church, Cherukunnu

The Thavam Church at Cherukunnu, is a famous Latin Catholic Church of North Malabar. This Church is known as the birthplace of "Chirakkal Pulaya Mission" later renamed as "Chirakkal Mission", the renowned Jesuit Missionary Rev.F Peter Kaironi SJ founded the mission by baptizing the 12 members lived in nearby paddy land "Dalil Vadakke Bhagam", those are belonging to scheduled cast downtrodden Hindu "Pulaya Tribes" later "Pulaya Cast" of North Malabar. The present-day Kannur Diocese consists of 95% churches and parishes formed by the Jesuits under the leadership of Rev.F Peter Kaironi SJ by baptizing the Hindu Dalith Community. The last resting place of the pious missionary Rev.F Peter Kaironi SJ is situated in nearby cemetery, and it is a pilgrim place for the Dalit Christians in Kannur Diocese. This church is under Diocese of Kannur.  This church is at Thavam near Cherukunnu Town, around 17 km from Kannur, 19 km from Taliparamba and 15 km from Payyannur.

Pazhayangadi is the nearest rail head (Nearest Major Railway Station is Kannur). Kozhikode (Calicut) Airport is the nearest airport.  Kannur Airport is under construction near Mattannur.

St. Mary's Forane Church Edoor

St. Mary's Forane Church Edoor is one of the oldest churches and a notable Marian pilgrim centre in North Malabar of Kerala. It is near Iritty, the eastern town of Kannur district. This church is the first church in the name of St. Mary under the archdiocese of Thalassery. It is also the largest parish in the archdiocese. It is situated about 6.5 kilometres from the town of Iritty, which is also known as "The Coorg valley in the Gods' own country".

Annapoorneshwari Temple, Cherukunnu

Annapoorneshwari Temple located at Cherukunnu, is a famous temple of North Malabar. At this temple, Lord Krishna is co-located with Sree Annapoorneswari.  It is believed that Sree Annapoorneswari has visited the shrine which was under the sea.  It is also believed that this temple was constructed by Lord Parashurama – mythological architect of Kerala. The temple is near Cherukunnu Town, around 14 km from Kannur, 16 km from Taliparamba and 18 km from Payyannur.  A large Chira (Swimming pool) is also located near the temple which is very beautiful. The nearest railway station is Kannapuram Railway station.

Sree Rajarajeswara temple Taliparambu

The Rajarajeswara temple is a beautiful Shiva temple and is located at Taliparamba, Kannur district, Kerala, India. This temple is situated 25 km North of Kannur. The uniqueness of this temple is that it has no kodimaram/flagstaff and entry for women only after 8 pm. It is believed to be built during the times of Raja Raja Chola-I. At that time the Chola Empire consisted of the whole of South India, Ceylon and spread up to Malaysia and Indonesia.

The temple is regarded as one of the 108 ancient Shiva temples of Kerala. It has a prominent place amongst the numerous Shiva temples in south India. If any problem is encountered in temples of South India, the final solution is sought in this Temple through a prasna, a traditional method of astrological decision making. The prasna is conducted on a peedha (a raised platform) situated outside the temple.

The quadrangular sanctum has a two-tiered pyramidal roof. In front of the sanctum is the namaskara mandapam. The temple has no kodi maram (flagstaff) which is a unique feature as other temples in Kerala do have one.

Official Website Of Sree Rajarajeswara Temple

Trichambaram Temple Taliparambu

Trichambaram Temple is situated 20 km from Kannur, near Taliparamba town which is famous for its spices trade. The deity of the temple is Sree Krishna. The sculptures on the walls of the sanctum sanctorum are a class by themselves. The annual temple festival (Utsavam) is a colourful event. The fortnight-long festival begins on Kumbham 22 of Malayalam calendar (which generally falls on 6 March) every year with the kodiyettam (hoisting of a religious flag) and comes to an end on Meenam 6 (which generally falls on 20 March) with Koodipiriyal (Ending of this festival). In between these dates, for 11 days, thitambu nriththam (a sort of dance with idols of Sri Krishna and Balarama) is held at Pookoth Nada (1 km  from Trichambaram temple).

Holy Trinity Cathedral, Burnassery, Diocese of Kannur (Cannanore)

In 1498 Portuguese explorer Vasco da Gama landed at Calicut. Da Gama also visited Cannanore. In 1500 another Portuguese explorer Pedro Alvares Cabral reached Calicut. There were Franciscan missionaries with Cabral. He fell out with the Zamorin of Calicut. Cabral went to Cochin and was received by the ruler of Cochin. "In 1501 Portuguese explorer Cabral aligned with the Raja of Cannanore and set up a factory in Cannanore" "He brought with him a Franciscan friar Louis do Salvador to Cannanore" "Since then there has been a Portuguese Chapel in Cannanore" This church was named Nossa Senhora de Vitoria.   That is where the present Holy Trinity Church Cathedral stands. "That very same year another Portuguese explorer Joao da Nova established a second factory at Cannanore" "He brought with him four Franciscans, Two each for Cochin&Cannanore." The Portuguese Viceroy Francisco de Almeida built the famous St. Angelo Fort in Kannur and along with it he got ready St. James Chapel inside the fort in the year 1505. In 1508 Cannanore boasted a fort, a hospital, two Churches, warehouses and a powder factory.  The two churches were the Nossa Senhora de Vitoria (the place where the present Holy Trinity Cathedral Burnassery stands) and St. James Chapel inside the Fort St. Angelo. 

Pope John Paul II by the Apostolic Brief  Ad Perpetuam Rei Memoriam, dated 5 November 1998, created the diocese of Kannur from the diocese of Calicut.  On the same day, Rt.Rev. Dr. Varghese Chakkalakal who was a professor at St.Joseph's Seminary, Mangalore, and a priest of the diocese of Calicut, was elected the Bishop of Kannur and the Bishop-elect was consecrated on 7 February 1999 and he took charge of the diocese on 8 February 1999.  The Holy Trinity Church Burnaserry, situated at the place where the first Portuguese Christian Missionaries built their first Chapel in A.D.1501(Nossa Senhora de Vitoria), was raised as Cathedral of the diocese. This was a fitting tribute to those great pioneers who planted the seeds of the Gospel of Christ at Kannur.

Peralassery  Sri Subramhmanya Temple

Peralassery Sri Subrahmanya Temple is located at Mundallur, on the Kannur – Koothuparambu road. It is about 15 km from Kannur.

A popular shrine in Malabar region, the presiding deity is Lord Muruga. The temple is believed to be associated with the great epic, Ramayana.

The annual festival of the temple lasts for eight days. Many cultural events and art-forms such as Kathakali, Chakyarkoothu, Ottanthullal, Parayan Thullal and Seethankan Thullal are performed by eminent artists as part of the festivities. Another striking feature is a highly religious dance, Thidampunritham done by the priest.
main vazhipadu sarppabahli and egg vazhipadu

St. George Church ,Puravayal

St. George Church, Puravayal, situated at the centre of serene hilly greenery, with its uniquely distinct historical making and structure is an abode of spiritual experience. As a monument that marks the fulfillment of migrated people's quest for spirituality, it was established in the year 1957, in the northern part of Kerala, India. Jurisdictionally, it is located in the Nellickampoil Forane, under the Archdiocese of Thalassery. As the centerpiece of Puravayal village, St. George Church comes under the Ulickal Panchayath (formerly Padiyoor Kalliad), with a 3 kilometers of distance from Ulickal, on the Iritty-Mattara main road. Puravayal is also fortunate with a Government Lower Primary School and a Public Health Centre.

Moonnu Pettumma Palli, Pappinisseri

Moonnu Pettumma Palli (Mosque in the golden memory of the mother who gave birth to the three), popularly known as "Kattile Palli" (Mosque in the Jungle) is the most popular Mosque of North Malabar.  The annual festival known as "Kattile Palli Nercha" is attended by people from all religions.  This festival is one of the most important festival where the secularism of North Malabar is transparently visible.   This Mosque is at Pappinisseri, around 8 km from Kannur, 14 km from Taliparamba and 24p;km from Payyannur.

Pappinisseri is the nearest rail head (Nearest Major Railway Station is Kannur). Kozhikode (Calicut) Airport is the nearest airport.  Kannur Airport is under construction near Mattannur.

Aaron Church (St. Angelo's Church), Pappinisseri

Aaron Church (St. Angelo's Church) also known as Velapuram Church. This church is on NH-17 at Pappinisseri.  This is a very beautiful church one has to see.  This Church around 9 km from Kannur, 13 km from Taliparamba and 25p;km from Payyannur.

Many charity works are doing by this church like old age homes, medical treatment etc.

Pappinisseri is the nearest rail head (Nearest Major Railway Station is Kannur). Kozhikode (Calicut) Airport is the nearest airport.  Kannur Airport is under construction near Mattannur.

Aroli Sree Vadeswaram Shiva Kshethram, Pappinisseri

This temple is situated at Aroli village in Pappinissery Panchayat.  The temple is built on top of a hill that looks like a mountain and hence this temple is known as 'Sree Kailasam' of North Malabar.  The temple is under Chirakkal Devaswom Board.  
Pappinisseri is the nearest rail head (Nearest Major Railway Station is Kannur). Kozhikode (Calicut) Airport is the nearest airport.  Kannur Airport is under construction near Mattannur.

Madayi Kavu Pazhayangadi

This is a very famous temple of Lord Bhagavathi.  The annual festival of 'Pooram Kuli' is attended by thousands of people from all the fur districts of North Malabar.  The Madayi Kavu is situated over Madayi hills of Pazhayangadi town.

Madayi Palli, Pazhayangadi
This beautiful ancient mosque was originally built in 1124 by Malik Ibn Dinar, a Muslim preacher. A block of white marble in the mosque is believed to have been brought from Mecca by its founder, who came to India to spread the word of Muhammad. Nearby lies a dilapidated fort believed to have been built by king Kolathiri.  This mosque is near Pazhayangadi town.

Kadalayi Sreekrishna Temple

Kadalayi Sreekrishna Temple is a famous temple of the District.  It is believed that poor Hindus who are not able to get married in front of Guruvayoorappan solemnize their marriage here.

Saidar Mosque, Thalassery

This a very beautiful mosque built in ancient days in the heart of Thalassery Town. This is among the famous mosques of North Malabar.  The Saidar Mosque is believed to had been built in the 12th century by Malik Ibn Dinar, a Muslim preacher.

Sree Jagannath Temple, Thalassery

It is situated near Temple Gate Railway Station, about one km from Thalassery Town. 
Idol Shivalingam was erected by Sreenarayana Guru in 1908. A statue of Sreenarayana Guru erected here by Swami Bodhananda in 1927 when Guru was alive. Guru had seen this statue at Colombo Port when it was bringing to Thalassery from Italy. It is made in Panchaloha by Thavarali, a famous sculptor from Italy.

Thiruvangad Temple, Thalassery

The Thiruvangad temple, dedicated to Sree Rama, one of the important temple of North Malabar  is located at Thalassery. The most striking feature of this temple is the copper sheeting of its roof, due to which it is known popularly as the Brass Pagoda. A part of the temple was damaged by Tipu's troops in the 18th century, but the temple itself is believed to have been saved from destruction by a miracle.
It was one of the outposts of the Thalassery fort in the eighteenth century. In its precincts, many conferences were held between the officials of the East India Company and local leaders, after which important political treaties and agreements were signed. The temple contains some interesting sculptures and lithic records.
The annual festival of temple commences on Vishu day in Medam (April–May) and lasts for seven days.

Sree Ramaswami Temple, Thalassery
Sree Ramaswami Temple, which is dedicated to Sri Rama, is one of the most important temples in North Malabar. It is situated in Thalassery. The exquisite carvings in the temple are believed to have been done nearly 400 years ago.

Sundareswara Temple, Talap, Kannur.
This temple was founded in 1916 by Sree Narayana Guru, Lord Siva is the deity consecrated in the temple which has since been opened to all irrespective of caste or creed. Eight-day festival is conducted in March–April every year. This temple still under malabar devaswom board temple list

Pallikunnu Sree Mookambika Temple Kannur

Sree Mookambika Temple is situated just 2 km from Kannur town and is just half kilometer from Kannur Central Jail. It is near to Krishna Menon Memorial Government Women College. This is one of the most prominent Mookambika temple after the one in Kolloor, Karnataka. The temple has been renovated recently and the annual "Ulsavam" attracts pilgrims from all over Kerala and Malayalis staying outside Kerala as well. One of the most beautiful temples in Kannur, keralites all over India visit the temple.It is also known as dakshina mookambika due its prominence

Oorpazhassi Kavu

This temple is one of the ancient temples in the region.
Bhagavati and Vettakkorumakan are the main deities in this temple.

Sri Mavilayikkavu
This temple is located in Mavilayi village about 13 km from Kannur town.
The temple is famous for "Adi Utsavam".
God Daivattar (Vishnu), Vettakarumakan, Ganapati, and Bhagavati are the main deities in the temple.

Muchilot Bhagavathi
One of the popular deities in Kannur District is Muchilot Bhagavathi. Last ten years witnessed Muchilot Bhagavathi perumkaliyattams at Karivellur, Payyanur, Kunhimangalam, Valapattanam, Muyyam, Vellave, Karamel etc.  Anustanangalum Samoohika Prasakthiyum describes the importance of Muchilot Bhagavathi in the social formation of North Kerala. There is a practice for supplying food to thousands of devotees in connection with  Muchilot Bhagavathi. Another work 'Muchilot Bhagavathi' narrates the origin and establishment of Muchilot Kavu in different parts of North Malabar. Highly decorative figures of Muchilot Bhagavathi attracts the minds of devotees by its aesthetic appeal. In Cherukunnu and Kannapuram yearly Muchilot Bhagavathi Theyyam is performed.

Cheruthazham Sree Raghavapuram Temple (Hanumarambalam)
This is a Hanuman temple located at Cheruthazham, 35 km from Kannur Town. Famously known as Hanumarambalam, it is believed that the temple was constructed in the 8th Century A.D. by the ruler Udaya Varman Kolathiri and was given to the 237 scholarly Brahmin families who were invited from the Tulunadu of present Karnataka.  Moreover, the “Thidambu Nritham” (holy dance performed by the Brahmins with the Idols of Gods on their head) with four idols at a time is performed only here.

Payyanur Sree Subramanya Swami Temple
Sree Subrahmanya Swami Temple of Payyanur is believed to be constructed by Lord Parasurama, the incarnation of Lord Vishnu.  There are references in Hindu Puranas about this temple and the temple town Payyanur. In Brahmanda Purana the temple and its town is being mentioned while Muni Garga explains about Kerala to the Pandavas during their exile (vanavasa). There are many unique features about this temple in the rituals performed, the architecture etc.  First of all the 12 ft tall compound wall constructed in a unique style is very rare kind in the temple architecture of Kara. The total area of this temple compound is above 3 acres. The two-storied sreekovil (sanctum sanctorum) is in the shape of “Gajaprishta”(back of an elephant). The 6-ft tall idol of the main deity Lord Subrahmanya is another attraction. In most of the Kerala temples the festival begins with the hoisting of the sacred flag.  But here there is no such custom of "kodiyettam” (flag hoisting) and even the flag mast is not present here. The “Ilanji” tree in the front yard of the temple remains a surprise to all devotees since this tree always flowers but never fruits. People belonging to the "kshatriya" community are not allowed to enter into the inside of the temple. Entry to the 'naalambalam" is denied to the monks who wear saffron and the members of 'kalakattu' 'kattumadam','kalloor', etc. who are believed to perform black magic,'antarjanams" (females of the Brahmin community), the "mootha poduval" (who are traditional custodians of the temple) etc. also.

Sree Kizhkkeykara Sree Krishna Temple

This temple was built around 3000 Years back at Chirakkal Kannur.  Right now as per the archeological dept., the manuscripts shows of 2500 years back and the scripts gives the picture like it was during the Chirakkal rajvamsham period the temple used to feed "Anadhanam" ror 2500 peoples at one time. The deity in the temple is of Lord Krishna in the form of Balagopala. The temple stands right in front of chirakkal pond (which is having a water area of 5 acres). To reach the temple from Kannur railway station 6.5 km by road, nearest railway station is Valapattanam.

Official Website Of Sree Kizhakkeykkara Sree Krishna Temple

Sree Thachu Kunnummal Sree Mahadevi Kshethram Chembilode

Temple situated in Chembilode Village, Kannur. Theyyam thira is the main celebration, Every year March 15 to 18 celebrating theyyam with a huge amount of Devotees.

See also
North Malabar
Kerala
Kannur District
Malabar (Northern Kerala)

References

 
Kannur
Kannur